Dealer may refer to:

Film and TV
 Dealers (film), a 1989 British film 
 Dealers (TV series), a reality television series where five art and antique dealers bid on items
 The Dealer (film), filmed in 2008 and released in 2010
 Dealer (TV series) a 2021 series

Gaming
 Dealer (card game), the player who deals the cards in a card game
 Croupier, the player who deals cards, or the employee of a gaming establishment who deals the cards
 Poker dealer, the player who deals cards, or the employee of a gaming establishment who deals the cards
 Dealer, a term in contract bridge for the player who makes the first call in the auction in the game

Music
 Dealer (band), a Nu-Metalcore band based out of Australia, formed in 2019
 Dealer (album), the second studio album by American emo revival band Foxing
 The Dealer (album), a 1966 album by jazz drummer/bandleader Chico Hamilton
 The Dealers, a 1964 album by jazz musician Mal Waldron
 "The Dealer" (song), a song by Stevie Nicks
 "Dealer", a song by Deep Purple from their 1975 album, Come Taste the Band
 "Dealer", a song by Traffic from their 1967 album, Mr. Fantasy and later covered by Santana on their 1978 album, Inner Secrets
 "Dealer", a song by Lana Del Rey from her 2021 album Blue Banisters

Sales
 Dealer (franchising), a person who sells on behalf of a company or organization, particularly in the automobile industry
 Antique dealer, someone who sells antiques
 Art dealer or gallerist, a person or company that buys and sells works of art
 Broker-dealer, a business firm that buys and sells securities before selling the securities to customers
 Car dealership, a business that sells new or used cars at the retail level
 Drug dealer, a person who sells illegal drugs

See also 
 Deal (disambiguation)
 Dealership (disambiguation)
 Death Dealer (disambiguation)
 Drug Dealer (disambiguation)
 Lady Double Dealer (disambiguation)